Vigor is a Brazilian dairy and food company and is the sixth largest dairy company in Brazil. The company is a subsidiary of Mexican dairy firm Grupo Lala. It is headquartered in São Paulo.

Still specializing in UHT milk and milk derivatives (varieties of yogurt, cheese, butter, ice cream, etc.), the company also has an interest in fruit juices, pasta, sauce and vegetable fats and oils. These products are distributed under well-known brand names such as Vigor, Leco, Danubio, Faixa Azul, Serrabella, Amélia, Franciscano, Carmelita e Mesa.

Through the synergy and experience of JBS in exports of meat and hides, the existing export markets and dairy out of Brazil, such as cream cheese and curd, which are exported to Europe, Egypt, Angola, Cape Verde and Russia.

Industrial units 
Vigor has 7 industrial plants located in 4 Brazilian states, they are São Paulo, Minas Gerais, Paraná and Goiás, the industrial plants are located in:

 São Paulo - São Paulo
 São Caetano do Sul - São Paulo
 Cruzeiro - São Paulo
 Anápolis - Goiás
 Lavras - Minas Gerais
 São Gonçalo do Sapucaí - Minas Gerais
 Santo Inácio - Paraná

Competitors 
The company is the sixth largest milk producer company in Brazil, and have many major competitors such as the Brazilians LBR - Lácteos Brasil, BRF  and multinationals such as Nestlé, Danone and Parmalat.

References

External links
 Official website

Companies listed on B3 (stock exchange)
Manufacturing companies based in São Paulo
Food and drink companies established in 1917
1917 establishments in Brazil
Brazilian brands
Dairy products companies of Brazil
Brazilian subsidiaries of foreign companies